Li Shizhou (born 27 November 1995 in Dalian) is a Chinese footballer who plays for China League Two side Wuxi Wugou.

Club career
In 2013, Li Shizhou started his professional footballer career with Liaoning Youth in the China League Two.  He transferred to Chinese Super League club Jiangsu Sainty in 2014. On 13 September 2014, Li made his debut for Jiangsu in the 2014 Chinese Super League against Beijing Guoan, coming on as a substitute for Ji Xiang in the 92nd minute. He was sent to the reserved team in 2015 and 2017. In June 2016, Li was loaned to China League Two side Shenyang Urban until 31 December 2016.

On 9 February 2018, Li was loaned to China League One side Zhejiang Yiteng until 31 December 2018.

Career statistics
Statistics accurate as of match played 31 December 2019.

References

External links

1995 births
Living people
Chinese footballers
Footballers from Dalian
Jiangsu F.C. players
Liaoning Shenyang Urban F.C. players
Zhejiang Yiteng F.C. players
Taizhou Yuanda F.C. players
Chinese Super League players
China League One players
China League Two players
Association football defenders